Padáň is a village and municipality in the Dunajská Streda District in the Trnava Region of south-west Slovakia.

History
The village was first recorded in 1254 as Padan, an old Pecheneg settlement. On the territory of the village, there used to be Petény village as well, which was mentioned in 1298 as the appurtenance of Pressburg Castle. Until the end of World War I, it was part of Hungary and fell within the Dunaszerdahely district of Pozsony County. After the Austro-Hungarian army disintegrated in November 1918, Czechoslovak troops occupied the area. After the Treaty of Trianon of 1920, the village became officially part of Czechoslovakia. In November 1938, the First Vienna Award granted the area to Hungary and it was held by Hungary until 1945. After Soviet occupation in 1945, Czechoslovak administration returned and the village became officially part of Czechoslovakia in 1947.

Demography 
In 1910, the village had 637, for the most part, Hungarian inhabitants. At the 2001 Census the recorded population of the village was 863 while an end-2008 estimate by the Statistical Office had the villages's population as 873. As of 2001, 94,44 per cent of its population was Hungarian while 5,21 per cent was Slovak. 50% of the inhabitants profess Protestantism, while adherents of Roman Catholicism number 41,95% of the total population.

References

External links
NGO website 
Local Reformed Church community 
Local news selection at www.parameter.hu 

Villages and municipalities in Dunajská Streda District
Hungarian communities in Slovakia